Lough Gullion is a small lake north of Craigavon, County Armagh in Northern Ireland.

Wildlife

The lough is vegetated with bur-reed and water plantain. Regular birds visiting the lough include tufted duck, mute swan, pochard and northern shoveler. Fish include bream, roach, perch, eel and northern pike.

See also 
 List of loughs in Ireland

References 

Lakes of County Armagh